The Pursuit of the Phantom is a 1914 American drama film written and directed by Hobart Bosworth. The film stars Hobart Bosworth, Rhea Haines, Helen Wolcott, Courtenay Foote and Myrtle Stedman. The film was released on September 1, 1914, by Paramount Pictures.

Plot

Cast 
Hobart Bosworth as Richard Alden
Rhea Haines as Alden's sweetheart
Helen Wolcott as Helen Alden
Courtenay Foote as Wyant Van Zandt
Myrtle Stedman as Helen Alden
Emmett J. Flynn as	Van Zandt's son 
Nigel De Brulier as The Poet

References

External links 
 

1914 films
1910s English-language films
Silent American drama films
1914 drama films
Paramount Pictures films
American black-and-white films
American silent feature films
1910s American films
English-language drama films